Ana María Surra Spadea (Montevideo, 10 July 1952) is a Uruguayan-born social worker and politician.

She was elected to the Congress of Deputies in the list of Esquerra Republicana de Catalunya.

References

1952 births
21st-century Spanish women politicians
Living people
Members of the 11th Congress of Deputies (Spain)
Members of the 12th Congress of Deputies (Spain)
Members of the 13th Senate of Spain
Members of the 14th Senate of Spain
People from Montevideo
Republican Left of Catalonia politicians
Spanish social workers
Uruguayan expatriates in Spain
Women members of the Congress of Deputies (Spain)